Akbar Eftekhari (7 December 1943 – 9 November 2017) was an Iranian football midfielder who played for Iran. He also played for Taj SC and Persepolis.

References

1943 births
2017 deaths
Sportspeople from Khuzestan province
Iran international footballers
Iranian footballers
Persepolis F.C. players
Esteghlal F.C. players
Asian Games silver medalists for Iran
Asian Games medalists in football
Footballers at the 1966 Asian Games
1968 AFC Asian Cup players
AFC Asian Cup-winning players
Association football forwards
Medalists at the 1966 Asian Games